Lavalley or LaValley is the surname of the following people

Alexandre Lavalley (1821-1892), french engineer 
Gaston Lavalley (1834–1922), French writer and art historian
Janet LaValley, American alternative rock singer 
Jim Lavalley (born 1948), Canadian Olympic bobsledder
Terry R. LaValley (born 1956), American prelate of the Roman Catholic Church

See also
La Valley, Colorado
La Valley, Texas